Cantharus elegans is a species of sea snails in the family Pisaniidae, the true whelks. It is found in Panama and Mexico.

References

External links 
 
 Cantharus elegans at Museum of Comparative Zoology - Harvard University
 Cantharus elegans at conchology.be

Pisaniidae
Gastropods described in 1834
Taxa named by Edward Griffith (zoologist)
Molluscs of Mexico
Fauna of Panama